Darmstadt-Arheilgen station is a railway station in the municipality of Darmstadt, located in Hesse, Germany.

References

Rhine-Main S-Bahn stations
Arheilgen
Railway stations in Germany opened in 1894